Paul Cotter (born November 16, 1999) is an American professional ice hockey forward for the  Vegas Golden Knights of the National Hockey League (NHL).

Playing career
Cotter was selected in the fourth-round, 115th overall, by the Vegas Golden Knights at the 2018 NHL Entry Draft. 

During the  season, Cotter was recalled by the Golden Knights and made his NHL debut on November 9, 2021, against the Seattle Kraken. On November 11, he scored his first NHL goal against Cam Talbot of the Minnesota Wild.

Career statistics

Awards and honours

References

External links
 

1999 births
Living people
American men's ice hockey forwards
Chicago Wolves players
Henderson Silver Knights players
Ice hockey people from Michigan
Lincoln Stars players
London Knights players
Vegas Golden Knights draft picks
Vegas Golden Knights players
Western Michigan Broncos men's ice hockey players